Zelda Barbara Zabinsky is an industrial engineer and operations researcher specializing in the application of global optimization to logistics. She is a professor of industrial engineering at the University of Washington, where she also holds adjunct positions in electrical engineering, mechanical engineering, and civil and environmental engineering.

Education and career
Zabinsky did her undergraduate studies at the University of Puget Sound, majoring in mathematics with a minor in biology. Her interests from this time include optimization of transportation as well as predator-prey dynamics. After graduating, she worked at the National Marine Fisheries Service and Boeing before following her husband to Ann Arbor, Michigan, where she worked on applications of operations of research to health care at Vector Research, now part of the Altarum Institute. She completed her Ph.D. in industrial and operations engineering at the University of Michigan. Her 1985 dissertation, Computational Complexity of Adaptive Algorithms in Monte Carlo Optimization, was supervised by Robert L. Smith. She joined the University of Washington faculty in 1985.

Book
Zabinsky is the author of the book Stochastic Adaptive Search in Global Optimization (Kluwer, 2004).

Recognition
Zabinsky is a Fellow of the Institute of Industrial and Systems Engineers, elected in 2009. She was elected to the 2019 class of Fellows of the Institute for Operations Research and the Management Sciences, for "fundamental contributions in developing theory and algorithms for global optimization, with significant applications in engineering design, health care, and numerous other fields, and substantial impacts in education and service".

References

External links
Home page

Women in STEM: Ep. 8 Math House, interview with Zabinsky on encouraging children to follow STEM careers

Year of birth missing (living people)
Living people
American industrial engineers
American women engineers
Operations researchers
University of Puget Sound alumni
University of Michigan alumni
University of Washington faculty
Fellows of the Institute for Operations Research and the Management Sciences
20th-century American engineers
20th-century women engineers
21st-century American engineers
21st-century women engineers
20th-century American women
American women academics
21st-century American women